The following article is a list of Salvadoran departmental capitals.

List

See also

Departments of El Salvador
List of cities in El Salvador
Ranked list of Salvadoran departments

 
 

fr:Liste des capitales départementales salvadoriennes